Loch Vostok is a progressive metal band from Uppsala, Sweden. Named after a subterranean lake in Antarctica, it rose from collapse of progressive metal band Mayadome in 2001.

Biography
Loch Vostok was formed in 2001 by drummer Teddy Möller from the demise of his previous progressive metal band Mayadome. Bringing along keyboardist Sebastian Okupski and bass player Erik Grandin and new recruits guitarist Niklas Kupper and drummer Alvaro Svanerö, Möller switched roles from drums to lead singer and guitarist for the new band. However Grandin couldn't relocate to the United States and was replaced by Tomas "Tym" Jonsson. Möller had played with him previously in Mellow Poetry.

Loch Vostok recorded a self-financed album with producer Daniel Bergstrand in 2002. The result was Dark Logic. An album where the lyrics were entirely based upon infamous serial killers such as Henry Lee Lucas, Andrei Chikatilo and Ed Gein. The Russian distributor "CD-Maximum" was the first to pick up the album. Shortly after Magnetism records released it officially worldwide in August 2004.

After the album's release keyboardist Sebastian Okupski decided to leave Loch Vostok to focus on other projects. The vacancy was filled by Andreas Lindahl of Platitude. Due to the distance between Uppsala and Gothenburg he decided to leave the band after the recordings of the new album Destruction Time Again!.

In December 2005 keyboardist/composer Fredrik Klingwall of Flagellation, Anima Morte, etc. joined Loch Vostok. With Destruction Time Again! out on their new label, Escapi Music, they hit the road supporting King Diamond in the Scandinavian leg of his European 2006 tour. With the album well received Loch Vostok set out to do more gigs to support the album following the King Diamond tour in 2006 and 2007 with Pyramaze, Grave and Rotting Christ, as well as playing the 5-year anniversary of Headway Festival (A festival which they had also played in 2003) in Amsterdam.

In 2007 they also began the recordings of the follow-up to 2006 years Destruction Time Again! in Teddy's own Blueflame Studio, an album that came to be Reveal No Secrets, which then was released in the summer of 2009. After this release, the band entered a kind of hibernation era, with Möller being very busy with his other band, F.K.Ü. Current drummer Svanerö decided to leave, and was replaced by Lawrence Dinamarca. In 2011, the band signed a three-album deal with Vicisolum Productions and released critically acclaimed Dystopium, which was then shortly followed by a tour with Therion and Leprous. Tomas "Tym" Jonsson decided to leave the band before the tour, due to complications with a herniated spine, and was replaced on bass by Jimmy Mattsson of Planet Rain.

A year later, the fifth album, V - The Doctrine Decoded, was announced and furthermore released on 4 October 2012.

Members

Current members
 Teddy Möller – vocals/guitar (2000-2019)
 Niklas Kupper – guitar/backing vocals (2001–2009) and (2011–)
 Patrik Janson – bass (2018–)
 Lawrence Dinamarca – drums (2010–)
 Fredrik Klingwall - keyboard (2005-2015, 2016-)
 Jonas Radehorn - vocals (2019-)

Former members
 Erik Grandin – bass (2001–2002)
 Sebastian Okupski – keyboard (2001–2004)
 Andreas Lindahl – keyboard (2004–2005)
 Alvaro Svanerö – drums (2001–2009)
 Tomas "Tym" Jonsson – bass (2002–2010)
 Mano Lewys – guitar (2010–2011)
 Mattias Hagberg – keyboard, backing vocals (2015–2016)
 Jimmy Mattsson - bass (2010-2018)

Discography
 2004: Dark Logic
 2006: Destruction Time Again!
 2009: Reveal No Secrets
 2011: Dystopium
 2012: V - The Doctrine Decoded
 2015: From These Waters
 2017: Strife
 2021: Opus Ferox – The Great Escape

References

External links
 Official Website
 Loch Vostok at Myspace
 Loch Vostok at Last.fm
 ViciSolum website

Swedish progressive metal musical groups
Musical groups from Uppsala